Today is the twenty-fourth studio album by American country music group The Statler Brothers. It was released in 1983 via Mercury Records. The album peaked at number 193 on the Billboard 200 chart. It is the first Statler album to feature Jimmy Fortune, who replaced Lew DeWitt as the group's new tenor singer due to the latter's failing health.

Track listing
"Oh Baby Mine (I Get So Lonely)" (Pat Ballard) – 2:29
"Some Memories Last Forever" (Don Reid) – 3:24
"Promise" (Jimmy Fortune) – 2:12
"I'm Dyin' a Little Each Day" (Harold Reid) – 2:51
"There Is You" (D. Reid, H. Reid) – 2:17
"Guilty" (D. Reid, H. Reid) – 3:01
"Elizabeth" (Fortune) – 3:26
"Right on the Money" (John Rimel) – 3:00
"I Never Want to Kiss You Goodbye" (Kim Reid) – 2:23
"Sweet By and By" (Traditional) – 2:45

Charts

Weekly charts

Year-end charts

Certifications

References

1983 albums
The Statler Brothers albums
Mercury Records albums
Albums produced by Jerry Kennedy